Lord's Bank is a village in Belize District in the nation of Belize, Central America.

References

Populated places in Belize District
Belize Rural Central